Nurul Alam Atique is a Bangladeshi television dramatist, scriptwriter and film-maker. Atique received the Bangladesh National Film Award as the best scriptwriter for the full-length feature film Kirtonkhola (directed by Abu Syed). He also received the Meril Prothom Alo Critic Award as the best director and best scriptwriter for his first video film Choturtha Matra.

Filmography

Films
 Kittonkhola (dir. Abu Sayeed) / Scriptwriter
 Phulkumar (dir. Ashique Mostafa) / Scriptwriter
 Dubshatar / Scriptwriter, Director
 Sonabali / Scriptwriter, Director (ongoing)
 Laal Moroger Jhuti (2021)

Series
Ashare Golpo / Director (Bioscope Original)

Television productions
Choturtha Matra / TV Drama
Cycle er Dana / TV Drama
Polayanporbo / Serial
Jora Ilish / Telefilm
Bonophul / Telefilm
Jaal / Drama
Labonyo Prova / Mega serial
Chiti / Serial
Baro vooter kichha / Drama
cinderella / Drama
Odrissho manob / Telefilm
Mone-mone / Serial
Chondrobindu / Non-fiction
Ekta Phone kora jabe, plz./ Scriptwriter
Everest / Drama
Marmaid / Drama
Ekta kinle ekta free/ Mega serial
Icecream/ Drama
A journey by boat/ Drama
Bikol pakhir gaan/ Drama
Obak Shondesh/ Drama
Kushumer Cahrpash/ Drama
Highway/ Drama
Dalim Kumar/ Drama
Saifulartish/ Drama
Golpoguchcho/ serial (ongoing)

Books
Editor, Nree (issues on SM Sultan, Myth etc.)
Writer, Notun Cinema Shomoyer Proyojon
Writer, Moger Mulluke Firingeer Beshati

Awards
Film:
Best Scriptwriter (jointly with Abu Sayeed), Bangladesh National Award, Kittonkhola (dir. Abu Sayeed)
TV Drama:
Best Scriptwriter, Meril Prathom Alo Critic Award 2002, Choturtha Matra
Best Director, Meril Prathom Alo Critic Award 2002, Choturtha Matra
Best Director, Meril Prathom Alo Critic Award 2003, Cycle er Dana
Best Scriptwriter, Meril Prathom Alo Critic Award 2008, Ekta Phone kora jabe plz.
Best Director, Meril Prathom Alo Critic Award 2010, Bikol Pakhir Gaan
Best Scriptwriter, Meril Prathom Alo Critic Award 2010, Bikol Pakhir Gaan
Best Scriptwriter, Daily Star – SCB Critic Award 2010, Bikol Pakhir Gaan
Best Director, Daily Star – SCB Critic Award 2010, Bikol Pakhir Gaan

References

External links
 

Bangladeshi film directors
Living people
Year of birth missing (living people)
Best Film Directing Meril-Prothom Alo Critics Choice Award winners
Best Screenplay National Film Award (Bangladesh) winners